Faye Wright is a neighborhood in Salem, Oregon, United States, located in the southeast part of the city. The neighborhood is bordered on the east by Commercial Street SE, on the west by Liberty Road S, and on the south by Kuebler Boulevard SE. Faye Wright has a population of 2,672.

Parks and recreation
Faye Wright has 4 parks. They are Gracemont Park, Hillview Park, Wendy Kroger Park and Woodmansee Park.

Schools
Faye Wright neighborhood contains two Salem-Keizer Public Schools: Faye Wright Elementary School and Judson Middle School. Faye Wright also has two parochial schools: Immanuel Evangelical Lutheran School and Queen Of Peace Catholic School.

Neighborhood Association
The Faye Wright Neighborhood Association was founded in 1972.

References

External links 
 
 
 

Neighborhoods in Salem, Oregon